The Roman Catholic Diocese of Kimbe is  a suffragan diocese of the Roman Catholic Archdiocese of Rabaul. It was erected in 2003.

Coat of arms 
The new coat of arms of the Diocese was adopted in 2016. The proposal of coat of arms created Marek Sobola, a heraldic specialist from Slovakia, who also made a redesign of coat of arms for the bishop William Fey, O.F.M. Cap.

Bishops
Alphonse Liguori Chaupa (2003–2010)
William Fey, O.F.M. Cap. (2010-2019)
John Bosco Auram (2019-)

References

External links and references

papal bull - papal bull of 12 June 2003 establishing the diocese of Kimbe, accessed from vatican.va (bull published in the Acta Apostolicae Sedis vol. 95 (2003), no. 12, pp. 803-804)

Kimbe